Moke may refer to:

Places
 Moke (Bihar, India), a village
 Moke Lake, South Island, New Zealand
 Na Mokulua, two small Hawaiian islands known together as "The Mokes"

People
 Hans Moke Niemann (born 2003), American chess grandmaster
 Moké (1950–2001), Congolese painter
 Moké Diarra (born 1983), footballer from Mali
 Moké Kajima (born 1974), footballer from the Republic of the Congo
 Masena Moke (born 1980), footballer from the Republic of the Congo
 Peewee Moke (born 1986), Samoan rugby league player
 Mark "Moke" Bistany, American drummer

Arts and entertainment
 Moke (British band), British rock band
 Moke (Dutch band), indie rock band from Amsterdam
 A type of fictional lizard in the Harry Potter books
 Mokes, villains in the PlayStation video game Mad Blocker Alpha

Other uses
 MOKE (recreational vehicle), revival of Mini Moke by Moke International
 Moke (beverage), a traditional beverage from Flores Island, Indonesia
 Moke (slang), disparaging term for Pacific Islanders, especially Samoans/Hawaiians
 Moke (slang), British slang for a donkey
 Mini Moke, utility vehicle produced by the British Motor Corporation (BMC)
 Magneto-optic Kerr effect, MOKE, effect used for measuring magnetic properties
 Tropical Storm Moke (1984)